Simpsonichthys gibberatus is a species of killifish from the family Rivulidae.
It is found in the Rio Paracatu drainage of the Rio São Francisco basin, Brazil. in South America.

References

gibberatus
Taxa named by Wilson José Eduardo Moreira da Costa
Taxa named by Gilberto Campello Brasil
Fish described in 2006